Galopina is a genus of flowering plants in the family Rubiaceae. The genus is found in Malawi, Mozambique, Zimbabwe, South Africa, Lesotho, and Eswatini.

Species
Galopina aspera 
Galopina circaeoides 
Galopina crocyllioides 
Galopina tomentosa

References

Rubiaceae genera